Brøstadbotn is the administrative centre of Dyrøy Municipality in Troms og Finnmark county, Norway.  The village is located on the mainland of Norway, along the Dyrøysundet strait, looking across the strait at the island of Dyrøya to the southwest.  The Dyrøy Bridge is located just west of the village.  Brøstad Church is located in the village.  One of the main industries for the village is an electronics factory.

References

Villages in Troms
Dyrøy